The attack on Orleans was a naval and air action during World War I on 21 July 1918 when a German submarine fired on a small convoy of barges led by a tugboat off Orleans, Massachusetts, on the eastern coast of the Cape Cod peninsula. Several shells fired during the engagement likely missed their intended maritime or aircraft targets and fell to earth in the area around Orleans, giving the impression of a deliberate attack on the town.

Action

On the morning of 21 July 1918, German submarine , commanded by Kapitänleutnant Richard Feldt, was possibly attempting to cut the trans-Atlantic submarine communications cable from Orleans to Brest, France. While in the area for the buried cable, Feldt became aware of the passing tugboat Perth Amboy towing three barges and the three-masted schooner Lansford. It was claimed that U-156 fired two torpedoes, however these were likely shells that missed their target or were warning shots across the Perth Amboy's bow. It is unlikely the U-156 would have wasted valuable torpedoes on a group of small unarmed ships. Perth Amboy was heavily damaged, and the schooner and three barges were sunk.

Two Curtiss HS-2L flying boats from the recently completed Naval Air Station Chatham dropped bombs near U-156; but the bombs failed to explode due to technical problems or because the airmen on watch that Sunday were inexperienced at arming the bombs. U-156 elevated its guns to fire at the aircraft, but missed. Some shells landed harmlessly in a deserted marsh and on Nauset Beach, giving the town of Orleans the distinction of being the only spot in the United States that received enemy fire during World War I, but there is no evidence that these were deliberately aimed at the shore. There were no targets of value in the area other than the vessels. There were no fatalities.

Nearby Station No. 40 of the United States Coast Guard launched a surfboat under heavy enemy shellfire and rowed out to rescue the 32 sailors trapped aboard the tug and barges. After firing 147 shells in the hour-long engagement, U-156 submerged about 11:30a.m.

A sign above the beach commemorates the engagement:

"Three miles offshore, in the direction of the arrow, was the scene of attack of a German submarine on a tug and barges July 21, 1918. Several shells struck the beach. This is the only section of the United States' coast shelled by the enemy during World War I."

Aftermath
U-156 escaped away and headed north, where it attacked other Allied ships. A few shells and craters were found on shore in Orleans and in the nearby marsh. Newspapers dubbed the engagement the "Battle of Orleans" and offered a reward for the discovery of submarine supply bases in the Bay of Fundy. The attack on Orleans was the only Central Powers attack on the contiguous United States during World War I. It was also the first time that the United States was shelled by artillery of an external power since the Siege of Fort Texas in 1846.

Notes

References
 - Total pages: 129

External links

 
 The U-Boat That Threatened America

Conflicts in 1918
1918 in Massachusetts
Atlantic operations of World War I
Battles and conflicts without fatalities
History of Barnstable County, Massachusetts
Naval battles of World War I involving Germany
Naval battles of World War I involving the United States
Orleans, Massachusetts
United States home front during World War I
July 1918 events